Brahmaea celebica is a species of moth of the family Brahmaeidae first described by Lambertus Johannes Toxopeus in 1939. It is found on Sulawesi in Indonesia.

Taxonomy
Brahmaea celebica was formerly treated as a subspecies of Brahmaea hearseyi.

References

Brahmaeidae
Moths described in 1939
Taxa named by Lambertus Johannes Toxopeus